This is a list of the competitive honours won by county cricket clubs in England and Wales. It lists every club to have won any of the five domestic trophies.

These honours consist of the County Championship, the Royal London One-Day Cup, the Friends Provident Trophy, the Benson & Hedges Cup and the T20 Blast and their various former incarnations.

The County Championship's first season was 1890, and was the sole competition in county cricket for more than seventy years. The competition began with eight counties, which increased to fifteen by the end of the 19th century. Northamptonshire and Glamorgan joined in the first quarter of the twentieth century, since which time only Durham have added to the ranks.

The Gillette Cup was inaugurated in 1962 as the first limited overs competition. It began as a 65-over contest, and would undergo various name changes over its 36-year lifespan, with its time as the NatWest Trophy lasting the longest. The rules were often altered as well:  number of overs was varied, minor counties were invited to compete, and in 2006 a group stage was introduced.

The Sunday League began in 1969 as 40-over competition. Like the Gillette Cup, its format and name changed on a regular basis. It was the first county tournament to feature the white ball, coloured kits, and team nicknames. In 2010 the league and the Friends Provident Trophy (the latest successor of the Gillette Cup) were merged to form one tournament, with both a league and knockout stage.

The Benson & Hedges Cup was introduced in 1972 and lasted 30 years with the same sponsor. In its initial format, twenty teams were organised into four zonal groups in its original format with the games played at the start of the season in May. Various other teams made up the numbers, with 17 (and later 18) counties being joined by 2-3 extra sides. The first two teams in each group went on to contest a quarter-final knock-out stage. From 1993-1994 and in 1999, the tournament was a straight knockout tournament. The group stage returned between 1995 and 1998, and for the last three years of the tournament.

The Twenty20 Cup was created in 2003 and was based on three divisions of six teams, who played each other once (twice from 2008), with the top 8 teams qualifying for the quarter finals. In 2010 the tournament was renamed the Friends Provident t20 (later the Friends Life t20) and the 3 groups of six teams were changed to two groups of 9, and then back again for 2012 and 2013. The current tournament, the t20 Blast, begun in 2014, has again returned to having groups of 9, with the top four teams from each group qualifying for the quarter finals.

List

Summary Totals 

† denotes defunct competition

Note

References

English cricket lists